Druid Ridge Cemetery is located in Pikesville, Maryland, just outside the city of Baltimore. 

Among its monuments and graves are several noted sculptures by Hans Schuler and the final resting places of:
Felix Agnus, American Civil War general and newspaper publisher 
Frederick Bauernschmidt (1864–1933), brewer and philanthropist
Alfred Blalock, pioneering cardiovascular surgeon
Patricia Breslin, actress
Dorothy Benjamin Caruso, widow of tenor Enrico Caruso
William Bullock Clark (1860–1917), American geologist
William Jones "Boileryard" Clarke, baseball player and coach
Claribel Cone, physician and art collector
Etta Cone, famous art collector along with her sister who together helped establish the Baltimore Museum of Art
Walter Dandy, one of the fathers of neurosurgery
Samuel K. Dennis Jr. (1874–1953), Maryland politician and judge
Anthony Hastings George, British Consul-General.
Jennis Roy Galloway, Baltimore-born World War II Commander, later Managing Director of Union Carbide India, Ltd
Elisabeth Gilman, daughter of Daniel Coit Gilman and prominent Maryland socialist and civil liberties advocate
John F. Goucher, namesake of Goucher College
Virginia Hall, Baltimore-born World War II spy for the British Special Operations Executive
Eli Jones Henkle, U.S. Congressman, 5th District of Maryland
William Henry Howell (1860–1945), American physiologist He was buried at Druid Ridge Cemetery.
John Charles Linthicum, U.S. Congressman, 4th District of Maryland
Adolf Meyer (1866–1950), Swiss-American psychiatrist
Art Modell, owner of professional football teams
Curt Motton, professional baseball player
Rosa Ponselle, celebrated soprano
Thomas Rowe Price, Jr. (1898-1983), investment banker and founder of T. Rowe Price
Carl Vernon Sheridan, World War II Medal of Honor recipient
George A. Solter (1873–1950), American judge and lawyer
Hugh H. Young, pioneering urologist

References

External links
Druid Ridge Cemetery in Find a Grave

Pikesville, Maryland
Tourist attractions in Baltimore County, Maryland